The Federal Cabinet or Federal Government ( or ) is the chief executive body of the Federal Republic of Germany. It consists of the Federal Chancellor and cabinet ministers. The fundamentals of the cabinet's organisation as well as the method of its election and appointment as well as the procedure for its dismissal are set down in articles 62 through 69 of the Basic Law for the Federal Republic of Germany (Grundgesetz).

In contrast to the system under the Weimar Republic, the Bundestag may only dismiss the Chancellor with a constructive vote of no confidence (electing a new Chancellor at the same time) and can thereby only choose to dismiss the Chancellor with their entire cabinet and not simply individual ministers. These procedures and mechanisms were put in place by the authors of the Basic Law to both prevent another dictatorship and to ensure that there will not be a political vacuum left by the removal of Chancellor through a vote of confidence and the failure to elect a new one in their place, as had happened during the Weimar period with the Reichstag removing Chancellors but failing to agree on the election of a new one.

If the Chancellor loses a simple confidence motion (without the election of a new Chancellor by the Bundestag), this does not force them out of office, but allows the Chancellor, if they wish to do so, to ask the President of Germany for the dissolution of the Bundestag, triggering a snap election within 60 days (this happened in 1972, 1983 and 2005), or to ask the President to declare a legislative state of emergency, which allows the cabinet to use a simplified legislative procedure, in which bills proposed by the cabinet only need the consent of the Bundesrat (as yet, this has never been applied). The President is, however, not bound to follow the Chancellor's request in both cases.

The Chancellor and the other members of the cabinet are allowed to be also members of the Bundestag (though they are not required to be).

Process of nomination and appointment
The Chancellor is elected by the federal parliament (Bundestag) on proposal of the President of Germany with a majority of all members of the Bundestag (Chancellor-majority). However, the Bundestag is free to disregard the President's proposal (which has, as of 2021, never happened), in which case the parliament may within 14 days hold further ballots and try to elect another individual, which the parties in the Bundestag can now propose themselves, to the post with the same so called Chancellor-majority, whom the President is then obliged to appoint. If the Bundestag fails to do so, a last ballot will be held on the 15th day (again the parties in the Bundestag may field candidates): If an individual is elected with the Chancellor-majority, the President must appoint them as Chancellor. If not, the President is free to either appoint the individual, who received a plurality of votes on this last ballot, as Chancellor or to dissolve the Bundestag and call a snap election within 60 days.

Following their election in the Bundestag, the Chancellor-elect will visit Bellevue Palace, the residence of the President, to receive a certificate of appointment. This is the moment, the elected individual actually enters office. After this short appointment-ceremony, the Chancellor returns to the Bundestag, in order to take the oath of office. Having taken the oath, the Chancellor will once again visit Bellevue Palace, this time joined by the individuals the Chancellor intends to propose as members of the cabinet. The President will officially appoint the new cabinet members, again handing over certificates of appointment. After the ministers are appointed, they return to the Bundestag and take their oaths of office, completing the appointment-process.

Functioning
The Chancellor is the chief executive leader. Therefore, the whole cabinet's tenure is linked to the Chancellor's tenure: The Chancellor's (and the cabinet's) term automatically ends, if a newly elected Bundestag sits for the first time, if they are replaced by a constructive vote of no confidence, or if the Chancellor resigns or dies. Nevertheless, apart from the case of a constructive vote of no confidence, which by nature instantly invests a new Chancellor (and a new cabinet), the Chancellor and their ministers stay in office as an acting cabinet on the President's request, until the Bundestag has elected a new Chancellor. An acting cabinet and its members have (theoretically) the same powers as an ordinary cabinet, but the Chancellor may not ask the Bundestag for a motion of confidence or ask the President for the appointment of new ministers. If an acting minister leaves the cabinet, another member of government has to take over their department.

The Chancellor is responsible for guiding the cabinet and deciding its political direction. According to the principle of departmentalization, the cabinet ministers are free to carry out their duties independently within the boundaries set by the Chancellor's political directives. The Chancellor may at any time ask the President to dismiss a minister or to appoint a new minister; the President's appointment is only a formality, he may not refuse a Chancellors request for dismissal or appointment of a minister. The Chancellor also decides the scope of each minister's duties and can at his own discretion nominate ministers heading a department and so called ministers for special affairs without an own department. He can also lead a department himself, if he decides so.

The Chancellor's freedom to shape his cabinet is only limited by some constitutional provisions: The Chancellor has to appoint a Minister of Defence, a Minister of Economic Affairs and a Minister of Justice and is implicitly forbidden to head one of these departments himself, as the constitution invests these ministers with some special powers. For example, the Minister of Defence is commander-in-chief during peacetime (only in wartime does the Chancellor becomes supreme commander), the Minister of Economic Affairs may veto decisions by the Federal Cartel Office and the Minister of Justice appoints and dismisses the Public Prosecutor General. If two ministers disagree on a particular point, the cabinet resolves the conflict by a majority vote ( or principle of deference) or the Chancellor decides the case themselves. This often depends on the Chancellor's governing style.

The Chancellor has to appoint one of the cabinet ministers as Vice Chancellor, who may deputise for the Chancellor in their absence. In coalition governments the Vice Chancellor is usually the highest ranking minister of the second biggest coalition party. If the Chancellor dies or is unwilling or unable to act as Chancellor after the end of their term, until a new Chancellor has been elected, the Vice Chancellor becomes Acting Chancellor until the election of a new Chancellor by the Bundestag, who then has to form a new government. (To date, this has happened once: On 7 May 1974 Chancellor Willy Brandt resigned and declared his refusal to act as Chancellor until his successor's election. Vice Chancellor Walter Scheel was appointed as Acting Chancellor and served until the election of Helmut Schmidt on 16 May.)

The Chancellor is in charge of the government's administrative affairs, which are usually delegated to the Head of staff of the Chancellery, who is usually also appointed as minister for special affairs. Details are laid down in the government's rules for internal procedures. These state, for example, that the cabinet is quorate only if at least half of the ministers including the chair (the Chancellor or in their absence the Vice Chancellor) are present. The cabinet regularly convenes on Wednesday mornings in the Chancellery.

Pursuant to its (classified) rules of procedure, its sessions are confidential. According to practice, the Federal Government presents an annual report on arms exports, which contains statistical information on export permits issued and gives figures for the types of arms concerned as well as their destination. As a general rule, the Federal Government, if asked, is required to inform the Bundestag that the Federal Security Council has approved a given armaments export transaction or not.

Current cabinet

The current and 24th federal cabinet of Germany has been in office since 8 December 2021. It currently consists of the following ministers:

See also
 Council of Ministers of the German Democratic Republic (former East Germany)
 Federal Constitutional Court of Germany
 German federal election, 2021
 List of ministers of the Federal Republic of Germany — an alphabetical list of former ministers
 List of Federal Republic of Germany governments

References

External links
Official English names of German ministers and ministries (German Foreign Office)
 German cabinet website 
 German cabinet website  

 
Germany, Cabinet